Geoffrey Martin Hodgson (born 28 July 1946, Watford) is Emeritus Professor in Management at the London campus of Loughborough University, and also the editor-in-chief of the Journal of Institutional Economics.

Hodgson is recognised as one of the leading figures of modern critical institutionalism which carries forth the critical spirit and intellectual tradition of the founders of institutional economics, particularly that of Thorstein Veblen.  His broad research interests span from evolutionary economics and history of economic thought to Marxism and theoretical biology. He first became known for his book Economics and Institutions: A Manifesto for a Modern Institutional Economics (1988), which criticises modern 'mainstream' economics and calls to revise economic theory on the new grounds of institutionalism. His reputation has become enhanced owing to the trilogy of more recent books – Economics and Utopia (1999), How Economics Forgot History (2001) and The Evolution of Institutional Economics (2004) all of which built Hodgson's arguments into a more rounded and powerful critique of mainstream economic theory.

In 1988, Hodgson was involved in setting up the European Association for Evolutionary Political Economy (EAEPE). He was its general secretary until 1998. In 2000 Hodgson co-founded The Other Canon, a center and network for heterodox economics research, with main founder and executive chairman Erik Reinert and others. In 2013, Hodgson co-founded the World Interdisciplinary Network for Institutional Research (WINIR). In his 2015 book "Conceptualizing Capitalism" and an article entitled "Legal Institutionalism", he sketched his own research program of a legal institutionalism.

Institutions according to Hodgson
According to Hodgson, institutions are the stuff of social life. He defines them in a 2006 article by saying that institutions are "the systems of established and prevalent social rules that structure social interaction". Examples of institutions may be language, money, law, systems of weights and measures, table manners and organisations (for example firms). Conventions, that may be included in law, can be regarded to be institutions as well (Hodgson, 2006, p. 2).

What Hodgson considers important about institutions is the way that they structure social life and frame our perceptions and preferences. They also create stable expectations. He argues that: "Generally, institutions enable ordered thought, expectation, and action by imposing form and consistency on human activities". Consequently, institutions enable as well as constrain action.

Hodgson regards institutions as systems of rules. Broadly understood a rule is "a socially transmitted and customary normative injunction or immanently normative disposition, that in circumstances X do Y" (Hodgson, 2006, p. 3). This means that to be effective a rule has to be embedded in dispositions or habits. Mere decrees are not necessarily rules in this sense. Habits and customs help to give a normative status to a legal rule that can help a new law to become effective. In the process of social interaction norms are constantly changed (Hodgson, 2006, pp. 3–4)

Books
 Liberal Solidarity: The Political Economy of Social Democratic Liberalism (Edward Elagr Publishing, 2021) 
 Is Socialism Feasible? Towards an Alternative Future (Edward Elgar Publishing, 2019). 
 Is There a Future for Heterodox Economics? Institutions, Ideology and a Scientific Community (Edward Elgar Publishing, 2019). 
 Evolutionary Economics: Its Nature and Future (Cambridge University Press, 2019). 
 Wrong Turnings: How the Left Got Lost (University of Chicago Press, 2018). 
 Conceptualizing Capitalism: Institutions, Evolution, Future (University of Chicago Press, 2015) 
 From Pleasure Machines to Moral Communities: An Evolutionary Economics without Homo Economicus (University of Chicago Press, 2013) 
 (Edited with Charles Camic) Essential Writings of Thorstein Veblen (Routledge, London and New York, 2011). 
 (With Thorbjoern Knudsen) Darwin's Conjecture: The Search for General Principles of Social and Economic Evolution (University of Chicago Press, 2010). .
 Economics in the Shadows of Darwin and Marx (Edward Elgar, Cheltenham, 2006). . .
 The Evolution of Institutional Economics: Agency, Structure and Darwinism in American Institutionalism (Routledge, London, 2004). 
 A Modern Reader in Evolutionary and Institutional Economics (Edward Elgar Publishing, Cheltenham and Northampton, 2002) 
 How Economics Forgot History: The Problem of Historical Specificity in Social Science (Routledge, London, 2001). . Also in a Chinese edition.
 Evolution and Institutions: On Evolutionary Economics and the Evolution of Economics  (Edward Elgar Publishing, Cheltenham and Northampton, 1999) 
 Economics and Utopia: Why the Learning Economy is Not the End of History (Routledge, London, 1999) 
 Economics and Evolution: Bringing Life Back Into Economics (University of Michigan Press and Polity Press, 1993). 
 Economics and Institutions: A Manifesto for a Modern Institutional Economics (Polity Press, Cambridge, and University of Pennsylvania Press, Philadelphia, 1988). 
 After Marx and Sraffa: Essays in Political Economy (Macmillan Press, London, 1991). 
 The Democratic Economy: A New Look at Planning, Markets and Power (Penguin, Harmondsworth, 1984).  
 Capitalism, Value and Exploitation (Martin Robertson, Oxford, 1982). 
 Labour at the Crossroads (Martin Robertson, Oxford, 1981). 
 Socialism and Parliamentary Democracy (Spokesman, Nottingham, 1977. Also in Italian, Spanish, Turkish and Japanese editions) 
 Trotsky and Fatalistic Marxism (Spokesman, Nottingham. 1975). .

References
 Hodgson, G.M., ‘What are institutions?’, Journal of Economic Issues 2006 vol. 40 no.1, p. 2–4

External links

 Geoffrey Hodgson's homepage
 Geoffrey Hodgson's New Politics blog
 Journal of Institutional Economics
 World Interdisciplinary Network for Institutional Research (WINIR)
 How Did Economics Get into Such a State?

Academics of the University of Hertfordshire
English economists
People from Watford
1946 births
Living people
People educated at Cheshunt School